Waking into Nightmares is the second album by the American thrash metal band Warbringer, released on May 19, 2009, in the U.S. and May 25, 2009, in Europe.  It was produced by Gary Holt, guitarist of thrash metal band Exodus. The cover art was painted by Dan Seagrave. A video for the song Severed Reality was produced. Waking into Nightmares sold around 2,000 copies in its first week of release in the U.S.

Track listing 
All music by Warbringer, all lyrics by John Kevill, except track 8 by Ben Bennett

Bonus tracks

Personnel 

Warbringer
 John Kevill – vocals
 John Laux – guitars
 Adam Carroll – guitars
 Ben Bennett – bass, vocals on track 8
 Nic Ritter – drums

Production
 Gary Holt – production, guitar solo on track 11
 Adam Myatt – engineering
 Zack Ohren – mixing
 Dan Seagrave – artwork

References 

2009 albums
Warbringer albums
Century Media Records albums
Albums with cover art by Dan Seagrave